Robert G. Greenler is an American Physicist. His research centered on the optical properties of surfaces. Greenler received his B.S. from the University of Rochester and a Ph.D. from Johns Hopkins University. He taught Physics at the University of Wisconsin–Milwaukee from 1962-1992. He became Professor Emeritus of the same university after his retirement.

Professor Greenler was president of the Optical Society of America in 1987. He was the recipient of the Robert A. Millikan award in 1988.

He is well known for his popular lectures on physics "The Science Bag", which he started with colleague Glenn Schmieg in 1973. "The Science Bag" is a family friendly lecture series on every Friday evening and one Sunday a month at UW-Milwaukee Physics Building. In its 30-year existence the program attracted a cumulative audience of over 140,000 people.

Awards
University of Wisconsin-Milwaukee Ernest Spaights Plaza Award
Optical Society of America Esther Hoffman Beller Award.
 Esther Hoffman Beller Medal 1993
American Association of Physics Teachers Robert A. Millikan award, 1988
Elected Fellow of the American Association for the Advancement of Science

Books

Rainbows, Halos, and Glories 1980. 

Chasing the Rainbow: Recurrences in the Life of a Scientist 2000.   (hbk) (pbk)

Outside My Window: A Look at the Oakwood Village Nature Preserve

See also
Optical Society of America#Past Presidents of the OSA

References

External links
 Articles Published by early OSA Presidents  Journal of the Optical Society of America
What Makes a Physics-Outreach Program Family Friendly? by Robert G. Greenler

21st-century American physicists
Presidents of Optica (society)
Living people
University of Rochester alumni
Johns Hopkins University alumni
University of Wisconsin–Milwaukee faculty
Year of birth missing (living people)
Spectroscopists